Venero Armanno is an Australian novelist.  He was born in Brisbane of Sicilian parents. He received a BA from the University of Queensland, and later an MA and PhD in Creative Writing from the Queensland University of Technology. Armanno completed ten unpublished manuscripts over fourteen years before being accepted for publication.

He is currently a Senior Lecturer in the School of Communication & Arts at the University of Queensland, where he received the 2004 award for excellence in teaching.

Venero Armanno appeared in 2 events at the 2017 Brisbane Writers Festival in Brisbane, Queensland, Australia.

Awards 
 One Book One Brisbane, 2004: shortlisted for Firehead
 One Book One Brisbane, 2003: shortlisted for The Volcano
 Queensland Premier's Literary Awards, Best Fiction Book, 2002: winner for The Volcano
 Aurealis Awards for Excellence in Australian Speculative Fiction, Horror, 1995: runner-up for My Beautiful Friend
 Warana Writers' Awards, Steele Rudd Award, 1993: runner-up for Jumping at the Moon
 The Australian/Vogel Literary Award (for an unpublished manuscript), 1992: highly commended for The Lonely Hunter

Bibliography

Novels
 The Lonely Hunter (1993)
 Romeo of the Underworld (1994)
 My Beautiful Friend (1995)
 Strange Rain (1996)
 Firehead (1999)
 The Volcano (2001)
 Candle Life (2006)
 The Dirty Beat (2007)
 Black Mountain (2012)
 Burning Down (2017)
 The Crying Forest (2021)

Short story collections
 Jumping at the Moon (1992)
 Travel Under Any Star (2016)

Young adult
 The Ghost of Love Street (1997)
 The Ghost of Deadman's Beach (1998)

Children's
 The Very Super Adventures of Nic and Naomi (2002)

References

1959 births
Living people
20th-century Australian novelists
21st-century Australian novelists
Australian male novelists
Australian male short story writers
Australian people of Sicilian descent
Queensland University of Technology alumni
20th-century Australian short story writers
21st-century Australian short story writers
20th-century Australian male writers
21st-century Australian male writers